Inés Palombo (born July 15, 1985) is an Argentine actress and model, she is best known for portraying Sol Rivarola on the hit young television series of Cris Morena, Rebelde Way.

Career 
Inés Palombo debuted in 2003 as on Rebelde Way, the hit teenage telenovela of Cris Morena. She portrayed Sol Rivarola, the enemy of Mía Colucci (Luisana Lopilato). After Rebelde Way, she appeared on 2004 teenage telenovela of Morena, Floricienta.

In 2005, Palombo appeared in soap opera 1/2 falta, alongside Gabriela Toscano, Federico D'Elia and Gaston Grande. D'Elia and Grande also both co-starred in Rebelde Way, Grande as Joaquín Arias Parondo, and D'Elia as Professor Miranda. In 2006, she co-starred on telenovela Sos mi vida, starring Natalia Oreiro and Facundo Arana.

In 2007, Palombo portrayed Carolina on hit soap opera Romeo y Julieta, and also was included on Romeo y Julieta soundtrack. She is currently portraying Lily on Atracción x4, starring Luisana Lopilato, Camila Bordonaba and Rodrigo Guirao Díaz.

Personal life 
Since 2019, she is in a relationship with Argentine lawyer, Nicolás Ugarte. On January 10, 2022, she gave birth to the couple's first child, a boy, whom they called Felipe Ugarte.

Palombo is very good friends with the Romeo y Julieta star Brenda Gandini.

Filmography 
 Rebelde Way (2003) as Sol Rivarola
 Floricienta (2004) as Elena
 1/2 falta (2005) as Mayi
 Sos mi vida (2006) as Victoria "Vicky" Insúa
 Romeo y Julieta (2007) as Carolina Hernández
 Atracción x4 (2008) as Lily

Discography

Soundtrack albums 
 2007: Romeo y Julieta

References

External links 
 
 Inés Palombo at MySpace
 Inés Palombo at Facebook
 Spanish Forum

1985 births
Actresses from Rosario, Santa Fe
Living people
Argentine television actresses
Argentine female models
21st-century Argentine women singers